The 2012–13 ISU Junior Grand Prix was the 16th season of the series of junior international competitions organized by the International Skating Union. It was the junior-level complement to the 2012–13 ISU Grand Prix of Figure Skating contested by senior-level skaters. Skaters competed in the disciplines of men's singles, ladies' singles, pair skating, and ice dance.

Skaters earned points toward qualifying for the final at each of the seven Junior Grand Prix events. The top six skaters or teams from each discipline met at the 2012–13 Junior Grand Prix Final, which was held concurrently with the senior final.

Competitions
The locations of the JGP events change yearly. In the 2012–13 season, the series was composed of the following events in autumn 2012:

Qualifying
Skaters who reached the age of 13 by July 1, 2012 but had not turned 19 (singles and females of the other two disciplines) or 21 (male pair skaters and ice dancers) were eligible to compete on the junior circuit. Unlike the senior Grand Prix, skaters for the JGP are not seeded by the ISU. The number of entries allotted to each ISU member federation is determined by their skaters' placements at the previous season's Junior World Championships in each respective discipline.

A possibility for pairs to compete on both the junior and senior Grand Prix series in the same season was removed before the 2012–2013 season.

Overview

Series
The 2012–2013 ISU Junior Grand Prix season began in August 2012 in Courchevel, France. Russia's Elena Radionova and China's Jin Boyang, both making their JGP debut, won gold in the ladies' and men's event respectively, while France's Gabriella Papadakis / Guillaume Cizeron won gold in ice dance.

The next event was held in Lake Placid, USA. Joshua Farris of the United States won his fourth JGP title, while Japan's Satoko Miyahara, Canadian pair Margaret Purdy / Michael Marinaro, and American ice dancers Alexandra Aldridge / Daniel Eaton all recorded their first wins on the circuit.

The series then moved to Linz, Austria, where Radionova and Papadakis / Cizeron took their second titles and qualified for the JGP Final. Making their debuts, Nathan Chen of the United States and Brittany Jones / Ian Beharry of Canada won gold in the men's and pairs' events respectively.

The next event was held in Istanbul, Turkey, where reigning JGP Final champion Jason Brown won his second JGP title and qualified for his second final. This made it three for four for the American men and golds. Leah Keiser of the United States won gold in the ladies' event in her first JGP event. Satoko Miyahara of Japan won the bronze and qualified for the JGP Final. Alexandra Stepanova / Ivan Bukin won the ice dance event, winning their fifth JGP title.

Bled, Slovenia hosted the next event. Americans Joshua Farris and Aldridge / Eaton picked up their second wins of the season and qualified for the JGP Final, ahead of the silver medalists by 24 and 9 points respectively, while South Korea's Kim Hae-jin took her first JGP title.

The Junior Grand Prix series continued in Zagreb, Croatia. Canada's Purdy and Marinaro won their second title and qualified for the Final. In the free skate, fourth-place finishers Kamilla Gainetdinova / Ivan Bich became the first pair to land a side-by-side 3Lz+2T combination in a junior competition. Russia's Maxim Kovtun won the men's event. Russians Valeria Zenkova / Valerie Sinitsin and American Angela Wang won their first JGP titles, in ice dance and ladies' singles respectively. Nathan Chen, who had earlier won the Austrian event, withdrew due to a lower leg injury and thus did not qualify for the Final.

The final qualifying event was held in Chemnitz, Germany. Russians won all four disciplines – Anna Pogorilaya and Lina Fedorova / Maxim Miroshkin won their first JGP titles, while Alexandra Stepanova / Ivan Bukin won their sixth and Maxim Kovtun his third. All qualified for the JGP Final in Sochi.

Final
Russia swept all four gold medals at the JGP Final and the entire pairs' podium.

The United States' Joshua Farris won the men's short program ahead of Russia's Maxim Kovtun and the 2011 JGP Final champion Jason Brown. Kovtun won the free skate with a program that included a 4T-3T, 3A+3T, and 3A. He won the title by 11 points over the silver medalist, Farris, while Japan's Ryuju Hino moved ahead of Brown to take the bronze.

Russia's Elena Radionova was first in the ladies' short program, with the United States' Hannah Miller in second and Russia's Anna Pogorilaya in third. Radionova also placed first in the free skate and won the junior ladies' title by 11 points ahead of silver medalist Miller, who placed fourth in the segment, and bronze medalist Pogorilaya. Angela Wang of the United States was second in the free skate but remained in fourth overall.

Russia's Lina Fedorova / Maxim Miroshkin took the lead in the pair's short program, followed by Canada's Margaret Purdy / Michael Marinaro and Russia's Vasilisa Davankova / Andrei Deputat. Fedorova / Miroshkin were also first in the free skate and won gold with a total score slightly over five points ahead of the silver medalists, Davankova / Deputat, while Maria Vigalova / Egor Zakroev rose to take the bronze, producing a Russian sweep of the podium. Davankova / Deputat were the only junior pairs' medalists to attempt (and complete) side-by-side triple jumps. Vigalova (born 29 June 1999) was the youngest skater at the JGP Final.

Russia's Alexandra Stepanova / Ivan Bukin won the short dance ahead of France's Gabriella Papadakis / Guillaume Cizeron and 2011 JGP Final silver medalists Anna Yanovskaia / Sergei Mozgov. Stepanova / Bukin also placed first in the free dance and won gold by ten points ahead of Papadakis / Cizeron, while the United States' Alexandra Aldridge / Daniel Eaton moved past Yanovskaia / Mozgov to take the bronze.

Medalists

Men

Ladies

Pairs

Ice dance

Medals table

Junior Grand Prix Final qualification and qualifiers

Qualification rules
At each event, skaters earn points toward qualification for the Junior Grand Prix Final. Following the 7th event, the top six highest scoring skaters/teams advance to the Final. The points earned per placement are as follows:

There are seven tie-breakers in cases of a tie in overall points:
 Highest placement at an event. If a skater placed 1st and 3rd, the tiebreaker is the 1st place, and that beats a skater who placed 2nd in both events.
 Highest combined total scores in both events. If a skater earned 200 points at one event and 250 at a second, that skater would win in the second tie-break over a skater who earned 200 points at one event and 150 at another.
 Participated in two events.
 Highest combined scores in the free skating/free dance portion of both events.
 Highest individual score in the free skating/free dance portion from one event.
 Highest combined scores in the short program/short dance of both events.
 Highest number of total participants at the events.
If there is still a tie, the tie is considered unbreakable and the tied skaters all advance to the Junior Grand Prix Final.

Qualifiers

Top JGP scores
Top scores attained in Junior Grand Prix competitions.

Men

Ladies

Pairs

Ice dance

References

External links
 Results: JGP France, JGP United States, JGP Austria, JGP Turkey, JGP Slovenia, JGP Croatia, JGP Germany, JGP Final
 Standings: Men, Ladies, Pairs, Dance at the International Skating Union
 ISU Figure Skating - Official YouTube Channel
 Junior Grand Prix at the International Skating Union
 Official event websites: http://www.courchevel.com/juniorgrandprixoffigureskating/editorial.php?Rub=134 France], Austria 

ISU Junior Grand Prix
Junior Grand Prix
2012 in youth sport
2013 in youth sport